The South Simcoe Railway is a steam heritage railway in Tottenham, Ontario, north of Toronto. Operating excursions since 1992, it is the oldest operating steam heritage railway in Ontario and features the second oldest operating steam locomotive in Canada.

Operations and rolling stock
Although the trains stop in Beeton, passengers cannot disembark, as there is not a station there. The railway has plans to add a Beeton station, but as is common with many heritage railways, this sort of project is highly dependent on fundraising.

The railway has two ex-Canadian Pacific steam locomotives, the best known being an 1883 4-4-0 A2m #136, which was used in the 1970s CBC television series The National Dream. #136 helped build the transcontinental railroad, the Canadian Pacific, across Canada in the 1880s. The railway also owns a 1912 4-6-0 D10h, ex-CPR #1057, and two road-capable diesel locomotives, (ex-Canadian Pacific D-T-C #22 and ex-Norfolk Southern GE 70-ton diesel-electric #703). Rounding out the collection is a diesel-electric yard switcher, Ruston-Hornsby 165DE #10.

The excursion train is made up of restored 1920s era coaches, previously owned by the Canadian Pacific Railway, Canadian National Railway, Toronto, Hamilton and Buffalo Railway and the Louisville & Nashville Railroad. The railway's equipment collection also includes rolling stock not used on the excursions, including a former Ontario Northland Railway business car #200, a combination passenger/baggage coach used as a museum, two wooden cabooses, one steel wide-vision ex-CPR caboose, a ballast car, various boxcars, flat cars, and steam generator cars.

Regular excursions operate from the May long weekend through to the weekend after Thanksgiving. Excursions feature the conductor's commentary on the scenery, the history of the line, and the place of the railways in Canadian history. Special events during the year include the Easter Express, Halloween Adventure and the Santa Claus Express at Christmas, which have a holiday focus. The PBS series Shining Time Station was shot here and at Union Station.

Organization Volunteers
The driving force behind the South Simcoe Railway is Eric Smith, who is the organization's President, Operations Manager and Chief Mechanical Officer. He oversees all aspects of the operation of the railway and its volunteer members.

The excursion trains are operated by volunteers who have taken their training regarding all aspects of railway operation, and qualified as flagmen, trainmen, conductors, firemen or locomotive engineers.   All volunteers with operational qualifications haven written their Canadian Rail Operating Rules examination and GOI examination, and are required to regularly re-qualify.

Maintenance and restoration activities are also carried out by volunteers. This includes track, right-of-way, site and property maintenance, locomotive maintenance and repair, and coach maintenance, cleaning and repair.

Operational and restoration activities are managed and supervised by volunteer foremen, department managers and the Board of Directors; in all cases, these managers and directors are also active volunteers who take on roles in the day-to-day operation of the Railway.

Restoration
Engine #136 was returned to service in August 2011 after extensive restoration work by the organization's volunteers.  As of 2022, the South Simcoe Railway operates excursion trains behind either diesel locomotive #703 or steam locomotive #136. Engine #1057, which had hauled excursion trains since the 2001 season, has been out of service since 2007 awaiting maintenance.

See also

 List of heritage railways in Canada
 List of museums in Canada
 List of Ontario railways

References

External links

South Simcoe Railway

Rail transport in Simcoe County
Heritage railways in Ontario
Standard gauge railways in Canada